Sabanagrande is a Colombian municipality and town in the department of Atlántico.

References

External links
 Gobernacion del Atlantico - Sabanagrande
 Sabanagrande official website

Municipalities of Atlántico Department